Konstantin Alexandrovich Menshov (born 23 February 1983) is a Russian former competitive figure skater. He is the 2014 European bronze medalist, the 2015 Finlandia Trophy champion, a two-time (2010, 2012) Nebelhorn Trophy silver medalist, a two-time (2007, 2012) NRW Trophy champion, and the 2011 Russian national champion. Menshov is one of the skaters to have landed two quad jumps in a short program and three quad jumps in a free program.

Personal life 
Konstantin Alexandrovich Menshov was born on 23 February 1983 in Leningrad, Russian SFSR, Soviet Union, along with a fraternal twin brother, Nikita. In 2011, he received his diploma from the Lesgaft University for Physiculture and Sport in Saint Petersburg.

Career 
Menshov's first coach was Galina Kashina. He later trained under Evgeni Rukavicin in Saint Petersburg. During summers, he also had training camps in Luleå, Sweden and Jelgava, Latvia.

2010–11 season
Menshov won the silver medal at the 2010 Nebelhorn Trophy. At the 2011 Russian Championships, Menshov placed first in both the short and long program, to win the title. He was the only contender to attempt a quadruple toe loop in the long program. He finished 7th in his first trip to the European Championships.

2012–13 season
In the 2012–13 season, Menshov won another silver medal at the Nebelhorn Trophy. He placed 4th at both of his Grand Prix events, the 2012 Skate America and 2012 Rostelecom Cup, setting a new personal best overall score at his second event. He won again at the 2012 NRW Trophy with an overall score of 238.63 points, more than 26 points ahead of silver medalist Michal Březina. He won the bronze medal at the 2013 Russian Championships but was not named in the Russian team for the 2013 European Championships. The decision did not contravene regulations which stated that only the top two qualified automatically and the third skater could be determined by the coaches' council. However, an appeal was signed by the president of the Saint Petersburg figure skating federation, Oleg Nilov, and some competitors. Russian Minister of Sport Vitaly Mutko ordered the executive committee of the Russian figure skating federation to review the issue. They voted to uphold their original decision. Menshov was assigned to the 2013 World Team Trophy and placed third in the short program with a personal season's best score (80.60). In the free skate, he dislocated his right shoulder attempting a triple Axel and withdrew from the event. He had sustained that type of injury only once before, four years prior.

2013–14 season
In the 2013–14 season, Menshov finished 8th at the 2013 NHK Trophy and 4th at the 2013 Rostelecom Cup. Making his second European appearance, aged 30, he won the bronze medal at the 2014 European Championships in Budapest.

2014–15 season
During the 2014–15 Grand Prix series, he placed fifth at the 2014 Skate Canada International and fourth at the 2014 Trophée Éric Bompard. He finished third in the 2014–15 ISU Challenger Series standings after winning bronze both at the 2014 Nebelhorn Trophy and at the 2014 Golden Spin of Zagreb.

2015–16 season
Competing in the 2015–16 ISU Challenger Series, Menshov took bronze at the 2015 Nebelhorn Trophy before winning gold at the 2015 Finlandia Trophy, his first international victory since the 2012 NRW Trophy. He went on to win gold at the Merano Cup.

Menshov sustained a shoulder injury at the 2016 Russian Nationals. On June 1, 2016, he announced his retirement from competitive skating and his transition to a coaching career. Commenting in July 2016, he said, "I already had the same kind of injury with my other shoulder and, of course, it's quite problematic to compete with both those injuries. I was able to recover almost all of my jumping elements to the previous level, but the fact is that the performance of choreographic movements causes me pain."

Skating technique

Menshov practiced different quadruple jumps, such as the 4T, 4S, 4Lo, and 4T-3T combination, and also attempted a 4T-4T combination. Beginning in 2014, he included two quads in his short program – a 4T-3T combination and a solo 4S. He landed both of the jumps at his Grand Prix events and 2015 Russian Championships.

In the 2015–16 season, at the age of 32, Menshov attempted three quads in his free skate. He landed 4T-3T combination and 4S in his free skate at the 2015 Nebelhorn Trophy while falling on his 4T attempt in the second half. He landed three quads – 4T-3T, 4S and 4T – in the free program at the 2015 Merano Cup, although he stepped out on the last quad.

Programs

Competitive highlights 
GP: Grand Prix; CS: Challenger Series

References

External links 

 

Russian male single skaters
European Figure Skating Championships medalists
Figure skaters at the 2007 Winter Universiade
Living people
1983 births
Figure skaters from Saint Petersburg
Competitors at the 2005 Winter Universiade
Competitors at the 2009 Winter Universiade